Vietnam National Games (sometimes known as All-nation Sport and Physical Training Grand Festival) (Vietnamese: Đại hội Thể dục thể thao toàn quốc) is a four-year multi-sport event involving participants from provinces, centrally-controlled cities, public security, military, education and training.

They are permitted to establish teams that represent them to involve in contests. If grand festivals of provinces or municipalities are not held before national games, the presenting teams fail to take part in sport grand festival. The games is under regulation of the Vietnam Ministry of Culture, Sport and Tourism. The games was held six times till 2013.

The goals of these sports events are to examine the four-year training cycle of athletes, managerial civil servants, trainers..; to exercise the national sporting athletes for international competitions; to encourage provinces, major cities in training talent sporters.

2018 Vietnam national games
Host: Hanoi

2014 Vietnam national games
Hosts: Nam Định, and some sports held at Thái Bình, Hà Nam, Ninh Bình, Hai Phong, Hải Dương, Hòa Bình, Quảng Ninh, Ha Noi. This was 7th Vietnam national games.

The 2014 Vietnam National Games featured 36 sports in 743 events.

2010 Vietnam National Games
Host: Da Nang
Time: Jan–Dec 2010
Sports: 41, with 903 events.
Teams: 66
Final standing:

2006 Vietnam National Games
Host: Ho Chi Minh City
Time: Sept 2006
Sports: 40 ; with 53 disciplines.

2002 Vietnam National Games
Host: Ha Noi

1995 Vietnam National Games
Host: Ha Noi

1990 Vietnam National Games
Host: Ha Noi

1985 Vietnam National Games
Host: Ha Noi

References
The 7th Vietnam National Games 2014 : 36 sports.
Ends the 2010 Vietnam national games.
Ha Noi leads the table of 5th Vietnam national games 2006.
The official website of the 7th Vietnam National Games 2014

1985 establishments in Vietnam
ASEAN sports events
National Games
Vietnam
Recurring sporting events established in 1985